The Norway men's national under-20 basketball team is a national basketball team of Norway, administered by the Norwegian Basketball Association. It represents the country in men's international under-20 basketball competitions.

FIBA U20 European Championship participations

See also
Norway men's national basketball team
Norway men's national under-18 basketball team

References

External links
Archived records of Norway team participations

Basketball in Norway
Basketball
Men's national under-20 basketball teams